Ponniammanmedu is a developing residential area in North Chennai, a metropolitan city in Tamil Nadu, India.

Educational institution

School
 Everwin School
 Don Bosco Nursery and Primary School.
 Narayana School

Sub-Neighborhoods

 Kodungaiyur
 Balaji Nagar
 Kumaran Nagar
 Peravallur
 Kolathur
 Moolakadai
 Madhavaram
 Retteri junction
 Thiruppathi Nagar
 Vajravel Nagar
 Balakumaran Nagar

Surroundings

southeast = கொடுங்கையூர்

Churches

 CSI Church
 RC Church

Transportation

Various buses pass through Ponniammanmedu on the GNT Road, and Ponniammanmedu are easily accessible from Moolakadai. A new minibus shuttle is available frequently in Ponniammanmedu; they travel via Ponniammanmedu, S61-(Madhavaram to Perambur), and S68-(Moolakadai to Agaram)

Temples
Shri Karumaari Amman temple,
Shri Ponniamman temple,
Shri Sivan temple,
Shri Nagathamman Temple,
Shri Lakshmi Narashima temple and
Shri Kadumpadi Chinnamman temple
are located in Ponniammanmedu.

Neighbourhoods in Chennai